Whidden Creek is a stream in Polk County, Florida, in the United States.

Whidden Creek was probably either named for a leader in the Seminole Wars or for a pioneer family who lived there.

See also
List of rivers of Florida

References

Rivers of Polk County, Florida
Rivers of Florida